Bill Muirhead is a Scottish curler.

He is a  silver medallist, bronze medallist and three-time Scottish men's champion.

Teams

References

External links
 

Living people
Scottish male curlers
Scottish curling champions
Year of birth missing (living people)